Quiet Please... The New Best of Nick Lowe is a 49-track career-spanning collection of songs written by British songwriter Nick Lowe. As well as his solo work, it also features many of his collaborations with the likes of Rockpile, Brinsley Schwarz, Paul Carrack and Little Village. The compilation was released by Proper Records in the UK and Europe and by Yep Roc in the US. The collection was compiled by Gregg Geller.

Track listing 
All songs written by Nick Lowe except where noted.

Disc One
 "(What's So Funny 'Bout) Peace, Love, and Understanding" (as Brinsley Schwarz) - 3:33
 "So It Goes" - 2:33
 "Heart of the City" - 2:07
 "Endless Sleep" - 4:08
 "Marie Provost" - 2:49
 "I Love the Sound of Breaking Glass" (Lowe, Andrew Bodnar, Steve Goulding) - 3:13
 "Cracking Up" - 2:58
 "American Squirm" - 2:31
 "Cruel to Be Kind" (Ian Gomm, Lowe) - 3:28
 "Without Love" - 2:28
 "You Make Me" - 1:52
 "When I Write the Book" (Lowe, Rockpile) - 3:16
 "Play That Fast Thing (One More Time)" - 4:11
 "Burning" - 2:03
 "Heart" (Lowe, Rockpile) - 3:41
 "Raining, Raining" - 2:48
 "Ragin’ Eyes" - 2:40
 "Mess Around with Love" - 3:06
 "Wish You Were Here" - 3:15
 "L.A.F.S." - 3:33
 "Half a Boy and Half a Man" - 2:53
 "The Gee and the Rick and the Three Card Trick" - 4:21
 "The Rose of England" - 3:26
 "I Knew the Bride (When She Used to Rock and Roll)" - 4:24
 "Wishing Well" - 3:01

Disc Two
"Lovers Jamboree" (Paul Carrack, Lowe) - 3:37
"Shting-Shtang" - 3:20
"All Men Are Liars" - 3:22
"What's Shakin’ on The Hill" - 4:01
"Don’t Think About Her When You're Trying To Drive" (Demo) (Jim Keltner, John Hiatt, Ry Cooder) - 2:58
"Fool Who Knows" (Keltner, Hiatt, Cooder) - 3:45
"Soulful Wind" - 3:01
"The Beast in Me" - 2:28
"I Live on a Battlefield" (Paul Carrack, Lowe) - 3:25
"Shelley My Love" - 3:15
"You Inspire Me" - 3:09
"Lonesome Reverie" - 2:52
"Faithless Lover" - 2:46
"What Lack of Love Has Done" - 2:48
"Man That I’ve Become" - 2:53
"Lately I’ve Let Things Slide" - 3:05
"Homewrecker" - 3:08
"Has She Got a Friend?" - 2:38
"Let's Stay in and Make Love" - 3:49
"Indian Queens" - 3:43
"I Trained Her to Love Me" (Lowe, Bobby Irwin) - 3:00
"People Change" - 2:54
"Long Limbed Girl" - 2:53
"Hope For Us All" - 3:41

DVD
Full band concert recorded in Belgium 2007. The DVD also contains rare music videos.

Nick Lowe and Gold Top
Live at Ancienne Belgique
Brussels, Belgium
20 October 2007

Nick Lowe – vocals, guitar
Johnny Scott – guitar
Geraint Watkins – keyboards
Matt Radford – bass
Bobby Irwin – drums

Track listing

 "People Change"
 "Soulful Wind"
 "What's Shakin on the Hill"
 "Heart"
 "All Men Are Liars"
 "Without Love"
 "Has She Got A Friend"
 "I Trained Her To Love Me"
 "Cruel To Be Kind"
 "You Inspire Me"
 "Long Limbed Girl"
 "Shting-Shtang"
 "Rome Wasn't Built in a Day"
 "I Knew The Bride (When She Used To Rock And Roll)"
 "(What's So Funny 'Bout) Peace, Love And Understanding"
 "Heart of the City"
 "The Beast in Me"

Videos
 "I Love The Sound of Breaking Glass"
 "Little Hitler"
 "No Reason"
 "Cruel To Be Kind"
 "Cracking Up"
 "Ragin Eyes"
 "Half A Boy And Half A Man"
 "I Knew The Bride (When She Used To Rock And Roll)"
 "All Men Are Liars"

Personnel
Musicians:

Nick Lowe – acoustic guitar, bass, guitar, electric guitar, rhythm guitar, 8-string bass, cardboard box
 Bob Andrews – piano, keyboards, background vocals
 Ben Barson – piano, Hammond organ
 Roger Bechirian – organ, tambourine, background vocals
 Martin Belmont – guitar, electric guitar
 Jeff Blythe – saxophone
 Aldo Bocca – guitar
 Andrew Bodnar – bass
 Shane Bradley – bass
 Billy Bremner – guitar, background vocals
 Brinsley Schwarz – electric guitar, background vocals
 Neil Brockbank – vox organ
 Ray Brown – string bass
 Paul Carrack – organ, piano, keyboards, Hammond organ, background vocals
 Carlene Carter – piano, Hammond organ
 Mario Cippolina – bass
 Johnny Colla – guitar, saxophone, background vocals
 Ry Cooder – electric guitar
 Elvis Costello – background vocals
 Stefan Henry Cush – electric guitar, background vocals
 Austin DeLone – acoustic guitar, piano
 Steve Donnelly – guitar
 Dave Edmunds – organ, guitar, piano, electric guitar, background vocals
 James Eller – bass
 Bill Gibson – percussion, drums, background vocals
 Ian Gomm – guitar, background vocals
 Steve Goulding – drums
 Gary Grainger – fuzz guitar
 Chris Hayes – guitar, background vocals
 John Hiatt – guitar, vocals
 Matt Holland – piano, trumpet, flugelhorn
 Sean Hopper – keyboards, background vocals
 Bobby Irwin – drums, background vocals
 Jim Keltner – drums
 Neill King – piano, Hammond organ
 Bill Kirchen – trombone, electric guitar
 Huey Lewis – harmonica, background vocals
 Bob Loveday – violin, viola
 Steve Nieve – piano, Hammond organ
 Tessa Niles – background vocals
 Jon Henry Odgers – drums
 Phillip Frederick Odgers – acoustic guitar, background vocals
 Jimmy Paterson – trombone
 Nick Pentelow – tenor saxophone
 Dave Plews – trumpet
 Matt Radford – double bass
 Billy Rankin – percussion, drums
 Paul Riley – bass
 Paul Simmonds – bouzouki, guitar
 Paul Speare – saxophone
 Linnea Svensson – background vocals
 Bruce Thomas – bass
 Pete Thomas – drums
 Robert Trehern – drums, background vocals
 Geraint Watkins – organ, piano, electric guitar
 Terry Williams – drums
 Martin Winning – tenor saxophone

Production personnel:
 Vic Anesini – Mastering
 Paul Bass – Producer
 Roger Bechirian – Producer
 Will Birch – Liner Notes
 Neil Brockbank – Producer
 Dan Burn-Forti – Photography
 Elvis Costello – Producer
 Dave Edmunds – Producer
 Colin Fairley – Producer
 Gregg Geller – Liner Notes, Compilation Producer
 Huey Lewis – Producer
 Michael Putland – Photography
 Jake Rivier – Producer

References

External links
Electronic Press Kit for the collection

Nick Lowe albums
2009 greatest hits albums
Proper Records compilation albums
Yep Roc Records compilation albums